Amelogenin, X isoform is a protein that in humans is encoded by the AMELX gene. AMELX is located on the X chromosome and encodes a set of isoforms of amelogenin by alternative splicing. Amelogenin is an extracellular matrix protein involved in the process of amelogenesis, the formation of enamel on teeth.

Function 

AMELX is involved in biomineralization during tooth enamel development. The AMELX gene encodes for the structural modeling protein, amelogenin, which works with other amelogenesis-related proteins to direct the mineralisation of enamel. This process involves the organization of enamel rods, the basic unit of tooth enamel, as well as the inclusion and growth of hydroxyapatite crystals.

Clinical significance 

Mutations in AMELX result in amelogenesis imperfecta. It has been shown that mice with a knocked-out AMELX gene will present disorganized and hypoplastic enamel.

See also 
AMELY

References

External links

Further reading 

 
 
 
 
 
 
 
 
 
 
 
 
 
 
 
 
 

Genes on human chromosome X
Genetics